This is a bibliography of fantasy author Robert Holdstock.

Fiction

Short stories 

 Pauper's Plot, 1969 
 Microcosm, 1972
 Ash, Ash, 1974 (also published under the title Ashes) 
 The Graveyard Cross, 1976 
 Magic Man, 1976 
 On the Inside, 1976 
 The Time Beyond Age, 1976 
 Travellers, 1976 
 A Small Event, 1977 
 The Touch of a Vanished Hand, 1977 
 In the Valley of the Statues, 1979 
 Earth And Stone, 1980 
 Mythago Wood, 1981 (novella) 
 Where Time Winds Blow, 1981 
 The Phantom of the Valley, 1981 
 Manchanged, 1981 
 Walking on the Shores of Time, 1981 
 Elite: The Dark Wheel, 1984 (A novella based upon the computer game Elite by David Braben and Ian Bell) 
 The Boy who Jumped Rapids, 1984 
 Thorn, 1986 
 Scarrowfell, 1987
 The Shapechanger, 1989 
 Time of the Tree, 1989 
 The Bone Forest, 1991 
 The Ragthorn, 1991 (co-authored with Garry Kilworth)
 The Silvering, 1992 
 Infantasm, 1995

Novelizations of screenplays 

 Legend of the Werewolf, 1976 (under pseudonym Robert Black)
 The Satanists, 1977 (not filmed; under pseudonym Robert Black)
 The Emerald Forest, 1985

Other novels 

 Eye Among the Blind, 1976
 Earthwind, 1977
 Where Time Winds Blow, 1982
 In the Valley of the Statues, 1982 (short story collection)
 Ancient Echoes, 1996

Berserker series  
(under pseudonym Chris Carlsen)

 Shadow of the Wolf, 1977
 The Bull Chief, 1979 
 The Horned Warrior, 1979

Francoise Jeury series 

 Necromancer, 1978 
 The Fetch, 1991 (also published under the title Unknown Regions)

Raven series 
(under the pseudonym Richard Kirk)

 Swordsmistress of Chaos, 1978 (volume one co-authored with Angus Wells)
 A Time of Ghosts, 1978 (volume two)
 Lords of the Shadows, 1979 (volume four)

(Holdstock did not write volume three or five in this series)

The Professionals series 
(under the pseudonym Ken Blake)

 Cry Wolf, 1981
 Operation Susie, 1982
 The Untouchables, 1982
 You'll be All Right, 1982

(Other "Ken Blake" books in the series were written by Ken Bulmer)

Night Hunter series 
(under the pseudonym Robert Faulcon)

 The Stalking, 1983 
 The Talisman, 1983
 The Ghost Dance, 1984 
 The Shrine, 1984 
 The Hexing, 1984
 The Labyrinth, 1988

Ryhope Wood series 

 Mythago Wood, 1984
 Lavondyss, 1988
 The Bone Forest, 1991 (novella and short story collection)
 The Hollowing, 1993
 Merlin's Wood, 1994 (novel and two short stories only published in the UK)
 Gate of Ivory, Gate of Horn, 1997
 Avilion, 2009

Merlin Codex series 

 Celtika, 2001
 The Iron Grail, 2002
 The Broken Kings, 2007

 Non-fiction 

 Alien Landscapes, 1979 (co-authored with Malcolm Edwards)
 Space Wars: Worlds & Weapons, 1979 (under the pseudonym Steven Eisler) 
 Alien World: The Complete Illustrated Guide, (under the pseudonym Steven Eisler)
 Tour of the Universe: The Journey of a Lifetime, 1980 (co-authored with Malcolm Edwards)
 Magician: The Lost Journals of the Magus Geoffrey Carlyle, 1982 (co-authored with Malcolm Edwards)
 Realms of Fantasy, 1983 (co-authored with Malcolm Edwards)
 Lost Realms, 1985 (co-authored with Malcolm Edwards)
 Encyclopedia of Science Fiction, 1978 (Consulting Editor)

 Edited anthologies 

 Stars of Albion, 1979 (co-edited with Christopher Priest)

 Other Edens series 

 Other Edens, 1987 (co-edited with Christopher Evans) 
 Other Edens II, 1988 (co-edited with Christopher Evans)
 Other Edens III'', 1989 (co-edited with Christopher Evans)

Footnotes

References

Bibliographies by writer
Bibliographies of British writers
Fantasy bibliographies